Financial accounting is a branch of accounting concerned with the summary, analysis and reporting of financial transactions related to a business. This involves the preparation of financial statements available for public use. Stockholders, suppliers, banks, employees, government agencies, business owners, and other stakeholders are examples of people interested in receiving such information for decision making purposes.

Financial accountancy is governed by both local and international accounting standards. Generally Accepted Accounting Principles (GAAP) is the standard framework of guidelines for financial accounting used in any given jurisdiction. It includes the standards, conventions and rules that accountants follow in recording and summarizing and in the preparation of financial statements.

On the other hand, International Financial Reporting Standards (IFRS) is a set of  accounting standards stating how particular types of transactions and other events should be reported in financial statements. IFRS are issued by the International Accounting Standards Board (IASB). With IFRS becoming more widespread on the international scene, consistency in financial reporting has become more prevalent between global organizations.

While financial accounting is used to prepare accounting information for people outside the organization or not involved in the day-to-day running of the company, managerial accounting provides accounting information to help managers make decisions to manage the business.

Objectives
Financial accounting and financial reporting are often used as synonyms.

1. According to International Financial Reporting Standards: the objective of financial reporting is:

To provide financial information that is useful to existing and potential investors, lenders and other creditors in making decisions about providing resources to the reporting entity.

2. According to the European Accounting Association:

Capital maintenance is a competing objective of financial reporting.

Financial accounting is the preparation of financial statements that can be consumed by the public and the relevant stakeholders. Financial information would be useful to users if such qualitative characteristics are present. When producing financial statements, the following must comply: 
Fundamental Qualitative Characteristics:
 Relevance: Relevance is the capacity of the financial information to influence the decision of its users. The ingredients of relevance are the predictive value and confirmatory value. Materiality is a sub-quality of relevance. Information is considered material if its omission or misstatement could influence the economic decisions of users taken on the basis of the financial statements.
 Faithful Representation: Faithful representation means that the actual effects of the transactions shall be properly accounted for and reported in the financial statements. The words and numbers must match what really happened in the transaction. The ingredients of faithful representation are completeness, neutrality and free from error.
Enhancing Qualitative Characteristics:
 Verifiability: Verifiability implies consensus between the different knowledgeable and independent users of financial information. Such information must be supported by sufficient evidence to follow the principle of objectivity. 
 Comparability: Comparability is the uniform application of accounting methods across entities in the same industry. The principle of consistency is under comparability. Consistency is the uniform application of accounting across points in time within an entity.
 Understandability: Understandability means that accounting reports should be expressed as clearly as possible and should be understood by those to whom the information is relevant.
 Timeliness: Timeliness implies that financial information must be presented to the users before a decision is to be made.

Three components of financial statements

Statement of cash flows (cash flow statement)
The statement of cash flows considers the inputs and outputs in concrete cash within a stated period. The general template of a cash flow statement is as follows:
Cash Inflow - Cash Outflow + Opening Balance = Closing Balance

Example 1: in the beginning of September, Ellen started out with $5 in her bank account. During that same month, Ellen borrowed $20 from Tom. At the end of the month, Ellen bought a pair of shoes for $7. Ellen's cash flow statement for the month of September looks like this:
Cash inflow: $20
Cash outflow:$7
Opening balance: $5
Closing balance: $20 – $7 + $5 = $18

Example 2: in the beginning of June, WikiTables, a company that buys and resells tables, sold 2 tables. They'd originally bought the tables for $25 each, and sold them at a price of $50 per table. The first table was paid out in cash however the second one was bought in credit terms. WikiTables' cash flow statement for the month of June looks like this:
Cash inflow: $50 - How much WikiTables received in cash for the first table. They didn't receive cash for the second table (sold in credit terms).
Cash outflow: $50 - How much they'd originally bought the 2 tables for.
Opening balance: $0
Closing balance: $50 – 2*$25 + $0 = $50–50=$0 - Indeed, the cash flow for the month of June for WikiTables amounts to $0 and not $50.

Important: the cash flow statement only considers the exchange of actual cash, and ignores what the person in question owes or is owed.

Statement of financial performance (income statement, profit & loss (p&l) statement, or statement of operations) 
The statement of profit or income statement represents the changes in value of a company's accounts over a set period (most commonly one fiscal year), and may compare the changes to changes in the same accounts over the previous period. All changes are summarized on the "bottom line" as net income, often reported as "net loss" when income is less than zero.

The net profit or loss is determined by:

Sales (revenue)

– cost of goods sold

– selling, general, administrative expenses (SGA)

– depreciation/ amortization

= earnings before interest and taxes (EBIT)

– interest and tax expenses

= profit/loss

Statement of financial position (balance sheet) 
The balance sheet is the financial statement showing a firm's assets, liabilities and equity (capital) at a set point in time, usually the end of the fiscal year reported on the accompanying income statement. The total assets always equal the total combined liabilities and equity. This statement best demonstrates the basic accounting equation:
 Assets = Liabilities + Equity
 The statement can be used to help show the financial position of a company because liability accounts are external claims on the firm's assets while equity accounts are internal claims on the firm's assets. 

Accounting standards often set out a general format that companies are expected to follow when presenting their balance sheets. International Financial Reporting Standards (IFRS) normally require that companies report current assets and liabilities separately from non-current amounts. A GAAP-compliant balance sheet must list assets and liabilities based on decreasing liquidity, from most liquid to least liquid. As a result, current assets/liabilities are listed first followed by non-current assets/liabilities. However, an IFRS-compliant balance sheet must list assets/liabilities based on increasing liquidity, from least liquid to most liquid. As a result, non-current assets/liabilities are listed first followed by current assets/liabilities.

Current assets are the most liquid assets of a firm, which are expected to be realized within a 12-month period. Current assets include:
cash - physical money
accounts receivable - revenues earned but not yet collected
Merchandise inventory - consists of goods and services a firm currently owns until it ends up getting sold
Investee companies - expected to be held less than one financial period
prepaid expenses - expenses paid for in advance for use during that year

Non-current assets include fixed or long-term assets and intangible assets: 

fixed (long term) assets
property 
building 
equipment (such as factory machinery) 
intangible assets
copyrights
trademarks
patents
goodwill

Liabilities include:
current liabilities
trade accounts payable
dividends payable
employee salaries payable
interest (e.g. on debt) payable
long term liabilities
mortgage notes payable 
bonds payable

Owner's equity, sometimes referred to as net assets, is represented differently depending on the type of business ownership. Business ownership can be in the form of a sole proprietorship, partnership, or a corporation. For a corporation, the owner's equity portion usually shows common stock, and retained earnings (earnings kept in the company). Retained earnings come from the retained earnings statement, prepared prior to the balance sheet.

Statement of retained earnings (statement of changes in equity) 
This statement is additional to the three main statements described above. It shows how the distribution of income and transfer of dividends affects the wealth of shareholders in the company. The concept of retained earnings means profits of previous years that are accumulated till current period. Basic proforma for this statement is as follows:

Retained earnings at the beginning of period

+ Net Income for the period

- Dividends

= Retained earnings at the end of period.Basic concepts

The stable measuring assumption

One of the basic principles in accounting is “The Measuring Unit principle”: The unit of measure in accounting shall be the base money unit of the most relevant currency. This principle also assumes the unit of measure is stable; that is, changes in its general purchasing power are not considered sufficiently important to require adjustments to the basic financial statements.”

Historical Cost Accounting, i.e., financial capital maintenance in nominal monetary units, is based on the stable measuring unit assumption under which accountants simply assume that money, the monetary unit of measure, is perfectly stable in real value for the purpose of measuring (1) monetary items not inflation-indexed daily in terms of the Daily CPI and (2) constant real value non-monetary items not updated daily in terms of the Daily CPI during low and high inflation and deflation.

Units of constant purchasing power

The stable monetary unit assumption is not applied during hyperinflation. IFRS requires entities to implement capital maintenance in units of constant purchasing power in terms of IAS 29 Financial Reporting in Hyperinflationary Economies.

Financial accountants produce financial statements based on the accounting standards in a given jurisdiction. These standards may be the Generally Accepted Accounting Principles of a respective country, which are typically issued by a national standard setter, or International Financial Reporting Standards (IFRS), which are issued by the International Accounting Standards Board (IASB).

Financial accounting serves the following purposes:
 producing general purpose financial statements
 producing information used by the management of a business entity for decision making, planning and performance evaluation
 producing financial statements for meeting regulatory requirements.

Objectives of financial accounting

 Systematic recording of transactions: basic objective of accounting is to systematically record the financial aspects of business transactions (i.e. book-keeping).  These recorded transactions are later on classified and summarized logically for the preparation of financial statements and for their analysis and interpretation.
 Ascertainment of result of above recorded transactions: accountant prepares profit and loss account to know the result of business operations for a particular period of time. If expenses exceed revenue then it is said that the business is running under loss. The profit and loss account helps the management and different stakeholders in taking rational decisions. For example, if business is not proved to be remunerative or profitable, the cause of such a state of affairs can be investigated by the management for taking remedial steps.
 Ascertainment of the financial position of business: businessman is not only interested in knowing the result of the business in terms of profits or loss for a particular period but is also anxious to know that what he owes (liability) to the outsiders and what he owns (assets) on a certain date. To know this, accountant prepares a financial position statement of assets and liabilities of the business at a particular  point of time and helps in ascertaining the financial health of the business.
 Providing information to the users for rational decision-making: accounting as a ‘language of business’ communicates the financial result of an enterprise to various stakeholders by means of financial statements. Accounting aims to meet the financial information needs of the decision-makers and helps them in rational decision-making.
 To know the solvency position:''' by preparing the balance sheet, management not only reveals what is owned and owed by the enterprise, but also it gives the information regarding concern’s ability to meet its liabilities in the short run (liquidity position) and also in the long-run (solvency position) as and when they fall due.

Graphic definition 
The accounting equation (Assets = Liabilities + Owners' Equity) and financial statements are the main topics of financial accounting.

The trial balance, which is usually prepared using the double-entry accounting system, forms the basis for preparing the financial statements. All the figures in the trial balance are rearranged to prepare a profit & loss statement and balance sheet. Accounting standards determine the format for these accounts (SSAP, FRS, IFRS). Financial statements display the income and expenditure for the company and a summary of the assets, liabilities, and shareholders' or owners' equity of the company on the date to which the accounts were prepared.

Asset, expense, and dividend accounts have normal debit balances (i.e., debiting these types of accounts increases them).

Liability, revenue, and equity accounts have normal credit balances (i.e., crediting these types of accounts increases them).

 0 = Dr Assets                            Cr Owners' Equity                Cr Liabilities  
           .       _/\       .
           .      /    Cr Retained Earnings (profit)         Cr Common Stock  \      .
           .    _/\___      .            .
           .   / Dr Expenses       Cr Beginning Retained Earnings \     .            .
           .     Dr Dividends      Cr Revenue                           .            .
       \/  \__/
        increased by debits           increased by credits
 
 
           Crediting a credit                         
 Thus -------------------------> account increases its absolute value (balance)
            Debiting a debit                             
 
 
           Debiting a credit                         
 Thus -------------------------> account decreases its absolute value (balance)
           Crediting a debit

When the same thing is done to an account as its normal balance it increases; when the opposite is done, it will decrease.  Much like signs in math: two positive numbers are added and two negative numbers are also added.  It is only when there is one positive and one negative (opposites) that you will subtract.

However, it is important to note that there are instances of accounts, known as contra-accounts, which have a normal balance opposite that listed above. Examples include:
 Contra-asset accounts (such as accumulated depreciation and allowances for bad debt or obsolete inventory)
 Contra-revenue accounts (such as sales allowances)
 Contra-equity accounts (such as treasury stock)

Financial accounting versus cost accounting

Financial accounting aims at finding out results of accounting year in the form of Profit and Loss Account and Balance Sheet. Cost Accounting aims at computing cost of production/service in a scientific manner and facilitate cost control and cost reduction.
Financial accounting reports the results and position of business to government, creditors, investors, and external parties.
Cost Accounting is an internal reporting system for an organisation's own management for decision making.
 In financial accounting, cost classification based on type of transactions, e.g. salaries, repairs, insurance, stores etc. In cost accounting, classification is basically on the basis of functions, activities, products, process and on internal planning and control and information needs of the organization.
 Financial accounting aims at presenting ‘true and fair’ view of transactions, profit and loss for a period and Statement of financial position (Balance Sheet) on a given date.  It aims at computing ‘true and fair’ view of the cost of production/services offered by the firm.

Related qualification
Many professional accountancy qualifications cover the field of financial accountancy, including Certified Public Accountant CPA, Chartered Accountant (CA or other national designations, American Institute of Certified Public Accountants AICPA and Chartered Certified Accountant (ACCA).

See also
 Constant item purchasing power accounting
 DIRTI 5
 Historical cost accounting
 Philosophy of accounting
 Accounting analyst, whose job involves evaluating public company financial statements
 Management accounting, the other main division of accounting
 Bookkeeping

References

Further reading
 David Annand, Introduction to Financial Accounting, Athabasca University,  
 Financial Accounting (2015)   
 Johnny Jackson, Introduction to Financial Accounting, Thomas Edison State University.
 Alexander, D., Britton, A., Jorissen, A., "International Financial Reporting and Analysis", Second Edition, 2005,